Bayköy is a village in the central district of Hakkâri Province in Turkey. The village is populated by Kurds of the Pinyanişî tribe and had a population of 605 in 2022.

The hamlet of Dereköy is attached to the village.

The village is located just south of Hakkâri.

Population 
Population history from 2007 to 2022:

References 

Villages in Hakkâri District
Kurdish settlements in Hakkâri Province